Mymensingh Junction Railway Station is a railway junction located in Mymensingh, Bangladesh.

History 
The demand for jute was increasing all over the world. For the purpose of meeting that growing demand, there was a need for better communication system than the existing communication system to supply jute from Eastern Bengal to Port of Kolkata. Therefore in 1885 a 144 km wide meter gauge railway line named Dhaka State Railway was constructed to bring raw jute to Kolkata mainly by river which connects Mymensingh with Narayanganj. The railway junction in Mymensingh opened on 15 February 1886.

Criticisms 
Mymensingh Junction railway station is known to be unsanitary and a hotbed of pickpockets. The station is also allegedly occupied by ticket black marketers.

References

External link 
 
 

Mymensingh
Railway junction stations in Bangladesh
Railway stations opened in 1886
1886 establishments in British India